The Philadelphia Phillies are a Major League Baseball team based in Philadelphia, Pennsylvania. They  are a member of the Eastern Division of Major League Baseball's National League. The team has played officially under two names since beginning play in 1883: the current moniker, as well as the "Quakers", which was used in conjunction with "Phillies" during the team's early history. The team was also known unofficially as the "Blue Jays" during the World War II era. Since the franchise's inception,  players have made an appearance in a competitive game for the team, whether as an offensive player (batting and baserunning) or a defensive player (fielding, pitching, or both).

Of those  Phillies, 10 have had surnames beginning with the letter I, and 57 beginning with the letter J. Two members of this list have been inducted into the Baseball Hall of Fame: pitcher Ferguson Jenkins, who played two seasons with Philadelphia before joining the Chicago Cubs; and first baseman Hughie Jennings, whose tenure with the Phillies encompassed the 1901 and 1902 seasons. One list member was also elected to the Philadelphia Baseball Wall of Fame; Willie "Puddin' Head" Jones was the starting third baseman for the Whiz Kids during his 13 seasons with the team.

Among the 34 batters in this list, Orlando Isales has the highest batting average, at .400; he collected two hits in five at-bats during the Phillies' 1980 championship season. Other players with an average over .300 include Tadahito Iguchi (.303 in one season); and Jay Johnstone (.303 in five seasons), who has the highest mark among the players whose surnames begin with J. Jones leads all players on this list with 180 home runs and 753 runs batted in (RBI). Raúl Ibañez leads the I-named players with 70 home runs and 260 RBI.

Of this list's 33 pitchers, two share the best win–loss record, in terms of winning percentage: Alex Jones won one game and lost none; and Eric Junge collected a 2–0 record in two seasons with Philadelphia. Larry Jackson leads all pitchers in this list with 41 victories, while Syl Johnson's 51 defeats are the highest total in that category. Jackson's 373 strikeouts are the best total of any pitcher in this list. Among the pitchers whose names begin with I, Ham Iburg leads in wins (11), losses (18), winning percentage (.379), and strikeouts (106).

Footnotes
Key
 The National Baseball Hall of Fame and Museum determines which cap a player wears on their plaque, signifying "the team with which he made his most indelible mark". The Hall of Fame considers the player's wishes in making their decision, but the Hall makes the final decision as "it is important that the logo be emblematic of the historical accomplishments of that player’s career".
 Players are listed at a position if they appeared in 30% of their games or more during their Phillies career, as defined by Baseball-Reference. Additional positions may be shown on the Baseball-Reference website by following each player's citation.
 Franchise batting and pitching leaders are drawn from Baseball-Reference. A total of 1,500 plate appearances are needed to qualify for batting records, and 500 innings pitched or 50 decisions are required to qualify for pitching records.
 Statistics are correct as of the end of the 2010 Major League Baseball season.

List
Stan Jok is listed by Baseball-Reference as a third baseman and left fielder, but never appeared in a game in the field for the Phillies.

References
General

Inline citations

IJ